Gareth Andrew Duke (born 18 June 1986) is a former Paralympic swimmer from Great Britain competing in S6 classification events. Duke attended two Summer Paralympic Games winning gold in the 2004 Summer Paralympics in Athens. Duke has represented Britain at two IPC Swimming World Championships and has also held world records in several events. He is the cousin of para-athlete Kyron Duke.

Personal history
Duke was born in Cwmbran in Wales in 1986. As well as having achondroplasia, Duke was born with Alport's syndrome, a kidney disease, and suffers from reducing hearing and asthma. After suffering kidney failure he received a donor kidney in 2006 from his father, but when this failed Duke was forced to go on dialysis. He underwent another kidney transplant in 2010, receiving a kidney from his uncle, however the organ failed after about 16 months in July 2011, resulting in Duke retiring from swimming.

Career history

References

Paralympic swimmers of Great Britain
Swimmers at the 2004 Summer Paralympics
Swimmers at the 2008 Summer Paralympics
Paralympic gold medalists for Great Britain
Paralympic silver medalists for Great Britain
Paralympic bronze medalists for Great Britain
Welsh male swimmers
Living people
1986 births
Medalists at the 2004 Summer Paralympics
Medalists at the 2008 Summer Paralympics
Medalists at the World Para Swimming Championships
Paralympic medalists in swimming
British male breaststroke swimmers
British male freestyle swimmers
S6-classified Paralympic swimmers
21st-century British people